Emrys is a Welsh name (the Welsh form of Ambrose) and may refer to:

Allan Emrys Blakeney (1925–2011), tenth Premier of the Canadian province of Saskatchewan (1971–1982)
Charles Emrys Smith, Senior Lecturer in Economics and Education
Emrys ap Iwan (1851–1906), literary critic and writer on politics and religion
Emrys Davies (1904–1975), Glamorgan cricketer and later a Test cricket umpire
Emrys Evans (1891–1966), Welsh classicist and university principal
Emrys Evans (rugby) (1911–1983), Welsh dual-code international rugby union and rugby league footballer
Emrys G. Bowen (1900–1983), geographer
Emrys Hughes (1894–1969), Welsh Labour politician
Emrys Hughes (rugby league), Welsh rugby league footballer who played in the 1930s
Emrys James (1928–1989), Welsh Shakespearean actor
Emrys Jones (geographer), Professor of Geography at the London School of Economics
Emrys Jones (actor) (1915–1972), English actor
Emrys Roberts (Liberal politician) (1910–1990), Welsh Liberal politician and businessman
Emrys Roberts (poet) (1929–2012), Archdruid and poet
Emrys Wledig, Welsh for Ambrosius Aurelianus, 5th century war leader of the Romano-British
John Emrys Lloyd (1905–1987), British fencer
Paul Emrys-Evans (1894–1967), British Conservative Party politician
Ruthanna Emrys, American novelist
William Ambrose (Emrys) (1813–1873), 19th century Welsh language poet
William Emrys Williams (1896–1977), Editor-in-Chief of Penguin Books from 1936 to 1965

Fictional Characters
Emrys Killebrew from Marvel Comics who created Deadpool

Merlin (Emrys) from BBC Merlin

See also
Dinas Emrys (Welsh: fortress of Ambrosius), a rocky and wooded hillock near Beddgelert in Gwynedd, Wales
Merlin
Emarosa
Emarèse
Imerys

Welsh masculine given names